For the Rowing competition at the 1994 Asian Games in Hiroshima, Japan, men's and women's singles, doubles, and fours competed from October 7 to October 10.

Medalists

Men

Women

Medal table

References 
 New Straits Times, October 11, 1994
 Results

External links 
 Olympic Council of Asia

 
1994 Asian Games events
1994
Asian Games
1994 Asian Games